Henry Dickerson (born November 27, 1951) is a retired American basketball player and current college basketball coach. He was the head coach of the men's basketball team at North Carolina Central University from 2004 to 2009. He led the Eagles through their first two seasons of NCAA Division I competition in 2007–09.  He was born in Beckley, West Virginia.

Playing career

College
A 6'4" (1.93 m) 190 lb (86 kg) guard, Dickerson played at the University of Charleston in West Virginia from 1969 to 1973. As an NAIA All-American, Dickerson averaged 16 points and 12 rebounds during his four-year collegiate career from 1969–73, and is still the only person in the history of the conference to be named First Team All-Conference and Conference All-Tournament for four consecutive seasons.

NBA
From 1975 to 1977, Dickerson played in the National Basketball Association as a member of the Detroit Pistons and Atlanta Hawks. Before signing with the Hawks late in the 1976–77 season, Dickerson played in the Eastern Basketball Association for the Syracuse Centennials, averaging 27.1 points per game for the team.

Coaching career

University of Tennessee Chattanooga
Dickerson was head coach at the University of Tennessee at Chattanooga from 1997–2002.  Dickerson served as the associate head coach at UTC from 1989–1997 and helped lead those teams to six Southern Conference regular season titles, four conference tournament championships and four NCAA tournament appearances, including a visit to the "Sweet 16" in 1997 as a #14 seed.

North Carolina Central University
In his first season at NCCU, the 2004–05 Eagles finished with a 16–12 overall record and advanced to the quarterfinals of the CIAA Tournament. He led his squad to three victories over teams that played in the NCAA tournament, including road wins over Catawba and Bowie State, and a home win over the eventual NCAA Division II national champions Virginia Union.

In 2005–06, NCCU posted a 10–18 record with a nucleus of newcomers against a schedule that included seven opponents coming off NCAA Tournament appearances and an extra non-conference game against the defending NCAA Division II national champions. Among the 10 victories was a 43-point blowout of Columbus State University, a team that finished with a 23–9 record and advanced to the NCAA Regional semifinals.

In 2006–07, the Eagles finished their final season in the NCAA Division II ranks with a record of 13–15. NCCU defeated four ranked opponents, including the eventual NCAA Division II national champions, Barton College (Nov. 18, 2006). That victory marked the second time in the previous three seasons that the Eagles beat the eventual national title winner.

Johnston Community College

In 2011, Dickerson became the head coach at Johnston Community College.

References

External links
NBA statistics
Coach Dickerson at CSTV.com

1951 births
Living people
African-American basketball coaches
African-American basketball players
American men's basketball players
Atlanta Hawks players
Basketball coaches from West Virginia
Basketball players from West Virginia
Charleston Golden Eagles men's basketball coaches
Charleston Golden Eagles men's basketball players
Chattanooga Mocs men's basketball coaches
Detroit Pistons players
High school basketball coaches in the United States
Junior college men's basketball coaches in the United States
Marshall Thundering Herd men's basketball coaches
North Carolina Central Eagles men's basketball coaches
Sportspeople from Beckley, West Virginia
Shooting guards
Undrafted National Basketball Association players
21st-century African-American people
20th-century African-American sportspeople
Woodrow Wilson High School (Beckley, West Virginia) alumni